The toeless snake skink (Nessia monodactyla), also known as the one-toed nessia, is a species of skink endemic to island of Sri Lanka.

Habitat & distribution
Widely distributed in the wet climatic zones from 400-1500m, and known localities include Kandy, Nawalapitiya, Deniyaya, and Peradeniya.

Description
Midbody scales rows 26-28. Body is slender and of equal girth, from head to tail. Snout short and obtuse. Lower eyelid with a transparent disk. Limbs lacking digits.
Dorsum brown , dark or gray black.

Ecology & diet
Hides under rubble, decaying logs and in soil or humus in montane forests. When exposed, they immediately wriggle into loose soil or under rubble. Diet comprises insects.

Reproduction
2 eggs are laid in loose soil.

References
 http://reptile-database.reptarium.cz/species?genus=Nessia&species=monodactyla
 http://animaldiversity.ummz.umich.edu/accounts/Nessia_monodactyla/classification/
 Photos of Toeless Snake Skink

Reptiles of Sri Lanka
Nessia
Reptiles described in 1839
Taxa named by John Edward Gray